Poompuhar is a town in the Mayiladuthurai district in the southern Indian state of Tamil Nadu. It was once a flourishing ancient port city known as Kaveri poompattinam and Kaveripattanam (not to be confused with modern Kaveripattinam), which for a while served as the capital of the early Chola kings in Tamilakam. Puhar is located near the end point of the Kaveri river, aside the sea coast. It is mentioned in the Periplus of Ereythrean sea. It is now established by marine archeological research conducted by the National institute of marine archeology, Goa that much of the town was washed away by progressive erosion and floods. Submerged wharves and several meter lengths of pier walls have excavated in recent times have corroborated the literary references to Poompugar. It was rebuilt several times after that. Ancient Pottery dating back to the 4th century BCE have been discovered off shore by marine archeologists east of this town.

History

Descriptions in Tamil poetic works

A Purananuru poem (poem 30) says that big ships entered the port of Puhar without slacking sail, and poured out onto the beach precious merchandise brought from overseas. In the extensive markets of Puhar there were many tall mansions surrounded by platforms reached by high ladders. These mansions had many apartments and were provided with doorways, great and small, and with wide hallways and corridors (Pattinappaalai – II –142-158). In all parts of the town there were flags flying of various kinds and shapes.

Pattinappaalai, a poem that describes the ancient Puhar very vividly, was written by the poet Kadiyalur Uruthirangannanaar is part of the Ten Idylls anthology and was sung in praise of Karikala Chola, a second-century Chola king.

Merchants of Puhar

Pattinappaalai also gives an idealised description of the merchants plying their trade in Puhar (Pattinappaalai – II –199-212):

They shunned murder, and put aside theft, pleased the gods by fire offerings,…they regarded others rights as scrupulously as their own, they took nothing more than was due to them and never gave less than was due from them. Trading thus in many articles of merchandise, they enjoyed an ancient heritage of prosperity and lived in close proximity to one another.

In Buddhist literature

Buddhadatta, the 5th century writer who lived during the reign of Accutavikkante vividly describes the capital Kaveripattinam in his manuals (Pali language) as follows:

In the lovely Kaveripattana crowded with hordes of men and women from pure families 
endowed with all the requisites of a town with crystal clear water flowing in the river, 
filled with all kinds of precious stones, 
possessed of many kinds of bazaars,
beautified by many gardens,
in a beautiful and pleasant vihara built by Kanhadasa,
adorned with a mansion as high as the Kailasa,
and having different kinds of beautiful entrance-towers on the outer wall,
I lived in an old mansion there and wrote this work..

In the Nigamanagātha of Vinayavinicchaya, Buddhatta describes how he wrote the work while staying at the monastery built by one Venhudassa (Vishnudasa) on the banks of the Kaveri in a town called Bhootamangalam near Kaveripattinam.

City's destruction
The ancient city of Puhar was destroyed by the sea around 300 BC. Marine archeologists from the National Institute of Oceanography have established that this could have been the effects of sediment erosion and periodic tsunamis. Such a tsunami is mentioned in the Tamil poem Manimekhalai (see below), which relates that the town Kāveripattinam or Puhār was swallowed up by the sea. This event is supported by archeological finds of submerged ruins off the coast of modern Poompuhar. 
The town of Kāveripattinam is believed to have disappeared around 300 BC due to this tsunami

City layout

The general plan of the city of Puhar is described in considerable detail in the fifth book of Silapathikaram (c. ). The town was built on the north banks of the river Kaveri. The town had two distinct districts, Maruvurpakkam near the sea and Pattinappakkam to its west. These two villages were separated by a stretch of gardens and orchards where daily markets were held under the shades of the trees. The market place was known as Naalangadi during the day and as allangadi by night.

Maruvurpakkam

The district of Maruvurpakkam was near the beach and had several terraced mansions and warehoused with windows shaped like the eyes of the deer. Maruvurpakkam being close to the shore and hence to the shipyard was naturally preferred by the many overseas travellers, merchants and yavanas (foreigner) whose pleasant features arrested the eyes of the spectators living close to each other.

Maruvurpakkam was inhabited by the fisher folk. The town had several warehouses. Weavers, silk merchants, vendors, fish and meat sellers, potters, grain merchants, jewellers and diamond makers lived in Maruvurppakkam.

Pattinappakkam 

The King and nobles, rich traders, physicians, astrologers, members of the king's army, court dancers occupied Pattinappakkam. The five Manrams - Vellidai Manram, Elanchi Manram, Nedankal manram, Poothachathukkam and Pavaimanram were located in Pattinappakkam. Gardens like Elavanthikaicholai, Uyyanam, Chanpathivanam, Uvavanam, and Kaveravanam added beauty to the town.

In culture

The city of poompuhar is a very ancient one. Legends relate how great Muchukunda chola of solar race once led his troops to guard kingdom of lord indra namely amaravathi in battle against some powerful demons who were in possession of very destructive weapons. The king and his soldiers held guard without sleeping for 3600 years and as a matter of gratitude lord Indra king of devas ordered his chief engineer viswakarma to build the city on the same lines of amaravati. He also presented the king with sivalingam that he personally worshipped. The great Tamil work Silappathikaram says that in puhar ships creaked in with wealth from all 7 continents, that devas in guise of humans came and worshipped in its temples and that the nights were so bright that even a small grain of white lentil dropped in the beach sand could be spotted by naked eye.

Manimekalai
The ancient Tamil poem Manimekalai by the poet Seethalai Saathanar is set in the town of Kaveripattanam.
Ancient ruins of a 4th-5th-century Buddhist monastery, a Buddha statue, and a Buddhapada (footprint of the Buddha) were found in another section of the ancient city, now at Pallavanesvaram.

Geography

Politics
Poompuhar assembly constituency is part of Mayiladuturai (Lok Sabha constituency).

Tourism

The major tourists attractions in Poompuhar :

Silappathikara Art Gallery
A beautiful building of great sculptural value has been built as Sillappathikara Art Gallery. Scenes from Silappathikaram, the Epic of the land have been given lively shapes in stones on the walls of the Gallery. These sculptures carved by the sculptors of Mamallapuram Art College remain the treasure house of Tamil Culture.

Masilamani Nathar Koil
Though heavily eroded by the sea in a number of places, this temple built in 1305 by Maravarma Kulasekara Pandiyan, still manages to impress all the tourists to Poompuhar with its architectural richness.

Gallery

Notes

References 

 Mudaliar, A.S, Abithana Chintamani (1931), Reprinted 1984 Asian Educational Services, New Delhi.
 Nilakanta Sastri, K.A. (1935). The CōĻas, University of Madras, Madras (Reprinted 1984).
 http://www.nio.org/index/option/com_projdisp/task/show/tid/2/sid/15/pid/56
 https://web.archive.org/web/20050210100642/http://www.nio.org/projects/vora/project_vora_5.jsp

External links
 PoomPuhar College
 Poompugar in Memories in Asia

Cities and towns in Mayiladuthurai district
Ancient Indian cities
Former populated places in India
Buddhism amongst Tamils
Former capital cities in India